Air Chief Marshal Sir David George Parry-Evans,  (19 July 1935 – 25 August 2020) was a senior Royal Air Force commander.

RAF career
Educated at Berkhamsted School, Parry-Evans joined the Royal Air Force in 1956. He became Officer Commanding No. 214 Squadron in 1974 and Station Commander at RAF Marham in 1975. He was appointed Director of Defence Policy at the Ministry of Defence in 1979, Commandant of the RAF Staff College, Bracknell, in 1981 and then Air Officer Commanding No. 1 Group at RAF Bawtry in 1982, before becoming Air Officer Commanding No. 38 Group in 1984.

He went on to be Commander-in-Chief RAF Germany and Second Tactical Air Force in 1985, Deputy Chief of the Defence Staff (Programmes and Personnel) in 1987 and Air Member for Personnel in 1989 before retiring in 1991. In retirement he became President of the Shackleton Association.

Family
In 1960, he married Ann Reynolds; they had two sons.

Parry-Evans died on 25 August 2020, at the age of 85, following a short illness.

References

|-
 

|-

|-
 

1935 births
2020 deaths
People educated at Berkhamsted School
Knights Grand Cross of the Order of the Bath
Commanders of the Order of the British Empire
Royal Air Force air marshals